, kyona, Japanese mustard greens, or spider mustard, is a cultivar of Brassica rapa var. niposinica.

Description and use

Possessing dark green, serrated leaves, mizuna is described as having, when raw, a "piquant, mild peppery flavor...slightly spicy, but less so than arugula." It is also used in stir-fries, soups, and nabemono (Japanese hot pots).

Varieties

In addition to the term mizuna (and its alternates) being applied to at least two different species of Brassica, horticulturalists have defined and named a number of varieties. For example, a resource provided by Cornell University and the United States Department of Agriculture lists sixteen varieties including "Early Mizuna", "Kyona Mizuna", "Komatsuna Mizuna", "Vitamin Green Mizuna", "Kyoto Mizuna", "Happy Rich Mizuna", "Summer Fest Mizuna", "Tokyo Early Mizuna", "Mibuna Mizuna", "Red Komatsuna Mizuna", "Waido Mizuna" and "Purple Mizuna". There is also a variety known as pink mizuna.

Cultivation
Mizuna has been cultivated in Japan since ancient times. Mizuna was successfully grown in the International Space Station in 2019. It grows in hardiness zones 4 to 9, prefers full sun or partial shade, well-drained soil and a pH of 6.5-7.0. It can be grown as a microgreen, sowing every 3 cm, or for its leaves with a 20 cm spacing. It is produced by more than 30 countries around the world, but China, Japan, South Korea, India and United States account for 70% of global production.

References

External links
PROTAbase on Brassica rapa

Brassica
Leaf vegetables
Japanese vegetables
Space-flown life